Épendes may refer to:

Épendes, Fribourg
Épendes, Vaud